NCAA Division II independent schools are four-year institutions that compete in college athletics at the NCAA Division II level, but do not belong to an established athletic conference for a particular sport. These schools may however still compete as members of an athletic conference in other sports. A school may also be fully independent, and not belong to any athletic conference for any sport at all. The reason for independent status varies among institutions, but it is frequently because the school's primary athletic conference does not sponsor a particular sport.

Full independents

Current members

Notes

Men's sponsored sports by school
Departing members in pink.

Women's sponsored sports by school
Departing members in pink.

Other sponsored sports by school

‡ — D-I sport

Baseball independents
Does not include all-sports independent teams that sponsor the sport (Bluefield State and Salem), since they have been listed before.

Current member

Football independents

Does not include all-sports independent teams that sponsor the sport (Bluefield State), since they have been listed before.

Current members

Future members

Soccer independents

Does not include all-sports independent teams that sponsor the sport (UPR Bayamón and Salem men's soccer and Bluefield State, UPR Bayamón, UPR Río Piedras and Salem women's soccer), since they have been listed before.

Current members

Wrestling independents

Does not include all-sports independent teams that sponsor the sport (Bluefield State and UPR Mayagüez), since they have been listed before.

Current members

Other sports

Field hockey
Does not include all-sports independent teams that sponsor the sport, since they have been listed before.

Golf
Does not include all-sports independent teams that sponsor the sport (Bluefield State men's & women's golf), since they have been listed before.

Rowing
Does not include all-sports independent teams that sponsor the sport, since they have been listed before.

Swimming & diving
Does not include all-sports independent teams that sponsor the sport, since they have been listed before.

Tennis
Does not include all-sports independent teams that sponsor the sport (all of them in men's & women's tennis), since they have been listed before.

Sports not sponsored by D-II

References

See also
 NCAA Division I independent schools
 NCAA Division III independent schools
 NAIA independent schools